Mouna Noureddine (born Saadia Oueslati, 23 January 1937), is a Tunisian actress.

The pseudonym of Mouna Noureddine was suggested by Mohamed Hedi Remnissi, an artist working in the theater of Bizerte.

Biography

Early life 
Mouna Noureddine studied in the elementary school of Muslim girls in Hammam-Lif. During this period, she was part of a local theatre troupe called "Ennahdha ettamthilia" (the student rise). She got her degree in 1952 and enrolled in the schoolteachers college of Tunis. Two years later, she switched to the Arabic theatre school of Tunis.

At the age of fifteen, Mouna, while still a student, meets during the rehearsals of The merchant of Venice by William Shakespeare the young comedian Noureddine Kasbaoui to whom she gets married later. Mouna Noureddine gave birth to two boys and four girls In 1954, she worked in the municipal Arabic theatre troupe directed by Zeki Touleïmat.

The year after, Mohamed Agrebi, the director of the Tunis Municipality troupe, selects her to join his team, and by the time she became the one to choose for the leading roles in most of the plays.

Filmography 
 2015, The sky's limits, Fares Naanaa
 2000, The Season of Men, Moufida Tlatli
 1997, Keswa (the lost thread), Kelthoum Bornaz
 1996, A Summer in La Goulette, Férid Boughdir
 1994, The wind of fates, Ahmed Djemai
 1992, Les Zazous de la vague, Mohamed Ali Okbi
 1992, The Sultan of The Medina, Moncef Dhouib
 1989,  Nomad heart, Fitouri Belhiba
 1989,  Layla, my reason, Taïeb Louhichi
 1988, Sama
 1986, Man of Ashes
 1982, Shadow of the Earth, Taïeb Louhichi

References

External links 
 
 

1939 births
Living people
Tunisian film actresses
People from Tunis
20th-century Tunisian actresses